The Woodlands Mall is a two-story, enclosed shopping mall located at the intersection of Interstate 45 and Lake Woodlands Drive in the community of The Woodlands in unincorporated Montgomery County, Texas, United States, north of Houston. The Woodlands Mall features six anchor stores: Dick's Sporting Goods, Dillard's, Forever 21, JCPenney, Macy's, and Nordstrom. The Woodlands Mall is managed by Brookfield Properties.

History
Having grown from its initial roots as a resort-oriented master-planned community first begun in 1974, developer George P. Mitchell's The Woodlands began to rapidly grow with an influx of new families from Houston and other areas, and had also gained national prominence from the community being both host to the Shell Houston Open and home to the Cynthia Woods Mitchell Pavilion, which opened in 1990. By the 1990s, the community (and Montgomery County) had grown enough to the point where a new super-regional mall became a key priority of the community's developer, The Woodlands Corporation, who sought to develop the mall as part of its Town Center development.

The Woodlands Mall opened on October 5, 1994 with over 120 stores, including anchor tenants Dillard's, Foley's, Mervyn's and Sears, whose Homart Development Company jointly built the mall with The Woodlands Corporation. This was the final development by Homart, which was acquired by General Growth Properties the following year. In addition, the mall also contained a carousel and adjacent food court on its upper level, and several restaurants and smaller retailers on the periphery.

Before The Woodlands Mall opened, many residents of The Woodlands and Montgomery County (as well as the nearby community of Huntsville further north) traveled to another mall known as The Wharf currently located in Grogan's Mill for retail services. Greenspoint was the mall most directly impacted by The Woodlands Mall's opening, as Greenspoint consequently lost virtually all of its most critical (and most upscale) customer base, though Greenspoint already had been in decline due to competition from the more upscale Willowbrook and Deerbrook malls (which sustained themselves due to sizable suburban populations in their respective trade areas), as well as increased criminal activity within the Greenspoint area that further contributed to Greenspoint Mall's decline.

In 1998, JCPenney opened in an empty anchor space situated between Sears and Dillard's in the mall's northeast corner. In 2004, a  outdoor section was added featuring a Barnes & Noble bookstore, several upscale shops, and Class A office space, as well as a  waterway, which features a water taxi. In April 2007, the mall partnered with NearbyNow, a digital applications company based in California, to offer shoppers a service that allows them to search for items at the mall through their cell phones or home computers.

Since The Woodlands Mall's opening, there were 3 anchor changes:
 In 2005, Mervyn's closed all its locations in Greater Houston; the chain eventually went out of business in 2008. Mervyn's space was filled by both the Woodlands Children's Museum, and the Woodlands Xploration Station (the latter a satellite facility of the Houston Museum of Natural Science); both were later replaced in August 2010 with the largest Forever 21 location in Greater Houston.
 In September 2006, another original anchor, Houston-based Foley's was converted to Macy's as a result of Federated Department Stores acquiring Foley's parent company May Department Stores.
 At the beginning of 2013, Sears (the mall's original joint developer) closed its location at The Woodlands Mall after selling its lease back to the owner of the mall. Nordstrom replaced Sears, opening its second full-service location in the Houston area in September 2014 along with several new specialty stores, some of them in new specialty space carved out of the former Sears store.

References

External links

 

Brookfield Properties
Shopping malls in Greater Houston
Shopping malls established in 1994
1994 establishments in Texas